Tracfin (Traitement du renseignement et action contre les circuits financiers clandestins) is a service of the French Ministry of Finances. It fights money laundering.
Tracfin is a unit of French Ministry for Economy, Finance and Industry and the Ministry for the Budget, Public Accounts, the Civil Service and State Reform with a statewide reach. Since its foundation in 1990 its aim is to fight against illegal financial operations, money laundering and terrorism financing. It is now a secret service attached to the Ministry of Finance and Public Accounts (Ministère de l'Action et des Comptes publics) and its full name is La Cellule française de lutte contre le blanchiment de capitaux et le financement du terrorisme (the French Unit for Combating Money Laundering and the Financing of Terrorism).

See also
 Government of France

References

External links

Téléprocédure Ermes
 

French intelligence agencies
Anti-money laundering organizations
Terrorism articles needing infoboxes